Robin Fleming is a medieval historian, professor of history at Boston College, and a 2013 MacArthur Fellow. She has written several books focusing on the people of Roman Britain and early medieval Britain, using both archaeological evidence and written records.

Early life and education 
Fleming received her B.A. and Ph.D. from the University of California, Santa Barbara in 1977 and 1984.

Career and honors 
She has been the recipient of awards honoring her groundbreaking research: Matina S. Horner Distinguished Visiting Professor at the Radcliffe Institute for Advanced Study at Harvard (2009–2010), Member of the School of Historical Studies at the Institute for Advanced Study, Princeton (2002–2003), Fellow of the Guggenheim Foundation (2002), Fellow of the Bunting Institute at Harvard (1993–94), and Junior Fellow at the Harvard Society of Fellows (1986–89).

She is a fellow of the Massachusetts Historical Society, the Royal Historical Society, the London Society of Antiquaries, and the Medieval Academy of America.

In 2022, she gave the Ford Lectures at Oxford on "Dogsbodies and Dogs' Bodies: A Social and Cultural History of Roman Britain’s Dogs and People".

Bibliography

Books

Selected papers 
 Robin Fleming, "Monastic Lands and England's Defence in the Viking Age", The English Historical Review 100:395:247–265 (April 1985)

References

External links 
 Profile at Boston College

American medievalists
Women medievalists
Living people
1950s births
Boston College faculty
University of California, Santa Barbara alumni
MacArthur Fellows
Harvard Fellows
Institute for Advanced Study visiting scholars
Fellows of the Medieval Academy of America
American women historians
Fellows of the Society of Antiquaries of London
Fellows of the Royal Historical Society
Historians of the British Isles
21st-century American women